Dylan Gissi (born 27 April 1991) is a Swiss professional footballer who plays as a centre-back for Banfield.

He is the older brother of current fellow footballer Kevin Gissi.

Club career
Gissi started his career with Estudiantes in the Primera División in 2010, and then went on loan to Olimpo in July 2013.

References

External links
 Profile, footmercato.net
 

1991 births
Living people
Swiss men's footballers
Swiss expatriate footballers
Footballers from Geneva
Swiss people of Argentine descent
Sportspeople of Argentine descent
Swiss people of Italian descent
Sportspeople of Italian descent
Association football central defenders
Switzerland youth international footballers
Switzerland under-21 international footballers
Étoile Carouge FC players
FC Basel players
Arsenal de Sarandí footballers
Neuchâtel Xamax FCS players
Atlético Madrid footballers
Estudiantes de La Plata footballers
Olimpo footballers
Montpellier HSC players
Rosario Central footballers
Defensa y Justicia footballers
Club Atlético Patronato footballers
Atlético Tucumán footballers
Unión de Santa Fe footballers
Club Atlético Banfield footballers
Argentine Primera División players
Ligue 1 players
Swiss expatriate sportspeople in Spain
Swiss expatriate sportspeople in France
Expatriate footballers in Spain
Expatriate footballers in France